This article consists of several lists highlighting the political figures who, from 1864 onwards, have been serving as the Mayors of Bucharest, the capital city of Romania. The article comprises a main list showcasing the mayors of the city proper as well as several other smaller lists displaying the mayors of the six constituent Sectors of Bucharest (i.e. Sector 1, Sector 2, Sector 3, Sector 4, Sector 5, respectively Sector 6).

Mayors of the city proper (1864–present) 

Political legend

 (PNL)

 (PNȚCD)

 (FSN)

 (PD)

 (General or Colonel)

 (PCR)

 (PSD)/National Union for the Progress of Romania (UNPR)

Notes:

1 Served as Mayor until December 1996.

2 Served as acting/ad interim mayor while Victor Ciorbea was Prime Minister from January 1997 to April 1998.

Mayors of the sectors of Bucharest

Sector 1

Sector 2

Sector 3

Sector 4

Sector 5

Sector 6

References

 
Bucharest
Mayors